Park Hee-young (born 24 May 1987) is a South Korean professional golfer currently playing on the LPGA Tour.

Early golf career
As an amateur, Park was a three time member of the South Korean National team. Park was twice runner-up in the South Korea Amateur Open.

2005 was Park's first full year as a professional golfer. She won three times on the LPGA of Korea Tour which earned her rookie of the year honors. Park won another two KLPGA tournaments in 2006.

LPGA Tour career
Park earned her tour card at the 2007 LPGA qualifying school. She played in 28 LPGA events in 2008 and made the cut in 22 of them. Her best finish was a T4 and she earned $474,744 for the year, 35th on the tour's money list.

At the second LPGA event of 2009, Honda LPGA Thailand, Park shot an opening round 79 in the tournament. Shortly after her round was completed, Park had to go to a hospital. She was treated and released. Park completed the tournament, shooting rounds of 64, 69, 65, which enabled her to finish in solo second place three shots behind Lorena Ochoa. Later in 2009, Park finished second at the Mizuno Classic.

On 20 November 2011, Park won her first LPGA Tour event, the CME Group Titleholders. She finished two shots ahead of Paula Creamer and Sandra Gal.

Her second victory came in July 2013 at the Manulife Financial LPGA Classic in Canada. Tied with Angela Stanford at 258 (–26) after 72 holes, the two went to a sudden-death playoff on the par-5 18th hole. Park birdied the hole three times in regulation (par on Friday) and three times in the playoff to win.

Personal life
As of 2011, Park's sister Choo Young, is a player on the Korean LPGA Tour. Her sister will begin her rookie year on the LPGA Tour in 2015, after finishing in a tie for 11th place at Stage III of LPGA Q School in Daytona Beach, Florida.

Professional wins (10)

LPGA Tour wins (3)

^Co-sanctioned with the ALPG Tour

LPGA Tour playoff record (2–0)

LPGA of Korea Tour wins (6)
2004 Hite Cup (as an amateur)
2005 PAVV Invitational, two other wins
2006 Phoenix Park Classic, Lake Hills Classic

Ladies Asian Golf Tour wins (1)
2006 Thailand Ladies Open

Results in LPGA majors
Results not in chronological order before 2019.

^ The Evian Championship was added as a major in 2013

CUT = missed the halfway cut
NT = no tournament
"T" = tied

Summary

Most consecutive cuts made – 8 (2010 U.S. Open – 2012 LPGA)
Longest streak of top-10s – 1 (four times)

LPGA Tour career summary

 official through 2022 season

Team appearances
Amateur
Espirito Santo Trophy (representing South Korea): 2004

References

External links

Biography on seoulsisters.com

South Korean female golfers
LPGA Tour golfers
LPGA of Korea Tour golfers
Yonsei University alumni
1987 births
Living people